Didier Ekanza Simba (born 9 August 1969) is a Congolese former professional footballer who played as a midfielder. He was a squad member at the 1992, 1994 and 1998 Africa Cup of Nations.

References

1969 births
Living people
Democratic Republic of the Congo footballers
Association football midfielders
Democratic Republic of the Congo international footballers
AS Vita Club players
K. Beerschot V.A.C. players
K.S.K. Beveren players
Hapoel Beit She'an F.C. players
Maccabi Petah Tikva F.C. players
K Beerschot VA players
Belgian Pro League players
Challenger Pro League players
Liga Leumit players
Israeli Premier League players
Democratic Republic of the Congo expatriate footballers
Expatriate footballers in Belgium
Expatriate footballers in Israel
Democratic Republic of the Congo expatriate sportspeople in Belgium
Democratic Republic of the Congo expatriate sportspeople in Israel
Footballers from Kinshasa
21st-century Democratic Republic of the Congo people
1992 African Cup of Nations players
1994 African Cup of Nations players
1998 African Cup of Nations players